This is a list of members of the First German Bundestag – the lower house of parliament of the Federal Republic of Germany, whose members were in office from 1949 until 1953.

They were elected in the 1949 West German federal election.



Members

A 

 Konrad Adenauer, CDU (Chancellor)
 Willi Agatz, KPD
 Adolf Ahrens, DP
 Johannes Albers, CDU
 Luise Albertz, SPD
 Lisa Albrecht, SPD
 Jakob Altmaier, SPD
 Rudolf Amelunxen, Zentrum (until 7 October 1949)
 Maria Ansorge, SPD (from 17 November 1951)
 Anton von Aretin, BP (from 14 December 1951 FU)
 Josef Arndgen, CDU
 Adolf Arndt, SPD
 Otto Arnholz, SPD
 Thea Arnold, Zentrum (from 14 December 1951 FU, from 9 December 1952 Non-attached (GVP))
 Karl Atzenroth, FDP
 Hermann Aumer, BP (from 8 September 1950 Non-attached)

B 

 Fritz Baade, SPD
 Wilhelm Bahlburg, DP (from 13 September 1951 Non-attached, from 24 January 1952 DP-Gast, from 10 September 1952 Non-attached)
 Siegfried Bärsch, SPD
 Walter Bartram, CDU (from 13 May 1952)
 Friedrich Bauereisen, CSU
 Bernhard Bauknecht, CDU
 Joseph Baumgartner, BP (until 1 January 1951)
 Georg Baur, CDU
 Valentin Baur, SPD
 Paul Bausch, CDU
 Helmut Bazille, SPD
 Josef Becker, CDU
 Max Becker, FDP
 Arno Behrisch, SPD
 Karl Bergmann, SPD
 Ludwig Bergsträsser, SPD
 August Berlin, SPD
 Helmut Bertram, Zentrum (from 3 November 1949, from 14 December 1951 FU)
 Anton Besold, BP (from 14 December 1951 FU)
 Emil Bettgenhäuser, SPD
 Anna Maria Bieganowski, WAV (from 21 March 1952, from 23 April 1952 DP/DPB, from 9 December 1952 Non-attached)
 Karl Bielig, SPD
 Willi Birkelbach, SPD
 Peter Blachstein, SPD
 Martin Blank, FDP
 Theodor Blank, CDU
 Paul Bleiß, SPD
 Franz Blücher, FDP
 Hans Bodensteiner, CSU (from 14 November 1952 Non-attached (GVP))
 Johannes Böhm, SPD
 Willy Brandt, SPD
 Aenne Brauksiepe, CDU
 Heinrich von Brentano, CDU
 Wilhelm Brese, CDU
 Hermann Brill, SPD
 Else Brökelschen, CDU
 Paul Bromme, SPD
 Josef Brönner, CDU
 Walter Brookmann, CDU
 Eberhard Brünen, SPD
 Karl Brunner, SPD (until 13 November 1951)
 Gerd Bucerius, CDU

C 

 Carl von Campe, DP (from 23 January 1950, until 8 January 1952)
 Hermann Clausen, SSW (from 23 January 1952 FU-Gast, from 3 July 1953 Non-attached)
 Johann Cramer, SPD

D 

 Otto Dannebom, SPD
 Robert Dannemann, FDP
 Hugo Decker, BP
 Johannes Degener, CDU (until 31 December 1951)
 Thomas Dehler, FDP
 Gregor Determann, Zentrum (from 14 December 1951 FU)
 Anton Diel, SPD
 Maria Dietz, CDU
 Hans Dirscherl, FDP
 Clara Döhring, SPD
 Anton Donhauser, BP (from 8 September 1950 Non-attached, from 17 September 1952 CSU)
 Fritz Dorls, DKP-DRP (from 13 December 1950 WAV-Gast, from 17 January 1951 WAV, from 26 September 1951 Non-attached, am 23 October 1952 Mandatsaberkennung)
 August Dresbach, CDU

E 

 Anton Eberhard, FDP (from 3 October 1952)
 Heinrich Eckstein, CDU
 Eduard Edert, unabhängig (CDU/CSU-Gast)
 Hermann Ehlers, CDU
 Hermann Ehren, CDU
 Willi Eichler, SPD
 Josef Eichner, BP (from 14 December 1951 FU)
 Rudolf Eickhoff, DP
 Hans Ekstrand, SPD
 Hermann A. Eplée, CDU (from 16 January 1953)
 Ludwig Erhard, CDU
 Fritz Erler, SPD
 Franz Etzel, CDU (until 4 January 1953)
 Hermann Etzel, BP (from 14 December 1951 FU, from 3 December 1952 Non-attached (GVP))
 Peter Etzenbach, CDU
 August-Martin Euler, FDP
 Johannes Even, CDU
 Hans Ewers, DP

F 

 Ernst Falkner, BP (until 27 October 1950)
 Walter Faller, SPD (from 4 December 1951)
 Ernst Farke, DP
 Heinrich Fassbender, FDP
 Aloys Feldmann, CDU
 Conrad Fink, BP (from 14 December 1951 FU, from 5 January 1952 CSU)
 Walter Fisch, KPD
 Wilhelm Fischer, SPD (until 21 October 1951)
 Egon Franke, SPD (from 17 May 1951)
 Rudolf Freidhof, SPD
 Walter Freitag, SPD
 Richard Freudenberg, unabhängig (from 5 December 1952 Non-attached)
 Martin Frey, CDU
 Hans-Joachim Fricke, DP (from 22 March 1952)
 Ferdinand Friedensburg, CDU (from 1 February 1952)
 Hans Friedrich, FDP (from 5 October 1950 Non-attached, from 16 November 1950 BHE/DG, from 2 April 1952 FDP-Gast)
 Hans-Gerd Fröhlich, WAV (from 13 October 1950 BHE/DG, from 21 March 1952 Non-attached)
 Heinz Frommhold, DKP-DRP (from 7 September 1949 Nationale Rechte, from 5 October 1950 Non-attached (DRP), from 26 March 1952 DP-Gast, from 11 February 1953 Non-attached)
 Konrad Frühwald, FDP
 Gustav Fuchs, CSU
 Joseph-Ernst Graf Fugger von Glött, CSU
 Oscar Funcke, FDP (from 14 September 1951)
 Friedrich Funk, CSU
 Elimar Freiherr von Fürstenberg, BP (from 7 November 1950 Non-attached, from 19 January 1951 CSU)

G 

 Karl Gaul, FDP
 Karl Gengler, CDU
 Robert Geritzmann, SPD
 Heinrich Gerns, CDU
 Eugen Gerstenmaier, CDU
 Paul Gibbert, CDU
 Christian Giencke, CDU
 Heinrich Glasmeyer, Zentrum (from 23 November 1951 CDU)
 Alfred Gleisner, SPD
 Hermann Glüsing, CDU
 Josef Gockeln, CDU
 Günter Goetzendorff, WAV (from 29 March 1950 DRP-Gast, from 5 October 1950 Non-attached (DRP), from 29 April 1953 WAV)
 Hubertus von Golitschek, FDP
 Robert Görlinger, SPD
 Hermann Götz, CDU
 Otto Graf, SPD
 Otto Heinrich Greve, SPD
 Margarete Gröwel, CDU
 Arthur Grundmann, FDP
 Wilhelm Gülich, SPD
 Gustav Gundelach, KPD
 Bernhard Günther, CDU

H 

 Johannes Hagge, CDU (from 24 June 1953 FDP)
 Wilhelm Hamacher, Zentrum (until 29 July 1951)
 Richard Hammer, FDP
 Johannes Handschumacher, CDU (from 21 January 1953)
 Heinrich Happe, SPD
 Paul Harig, KPD
 Walther Hasemann, FDP
 Wolfgang Hedler, DP (from 19 January 1950 Non-attached, from 28 March 1950 DRP-Gast, from 16 September 1950 Non-attached, from 29 April 1953 WAV)
 Rudolf-Ernst Heiland, SPD
 Anne Marie Heiler, CDU
 Franz Heinen, SPD (from 24 July 1953)
 Martin Heix, CDU
 Heinrich Hellwege, DP
 Günther Henle, CDU
 Hans Henn, FDP (from 1 February 1952)
 Arno Hennig, SPD
 Fritz Henßler, SPD
 Gustav Herbig, SPD (until 1 December 1951)
 Matthäus Herrmann, SPD
 Theodor Heuss, FDP (until 15 September 1949, resigned upon being elected President)
 Anton Hilbert, CDU
 Werner Hilpert, CDU (until 10 October 1949)
 Heinrich Höcker, SPD
 Johannes Hoffmann, Zentrum (from 14 December 1951 FU)
 Curt Hoffmann, FDP (from 15 June 1951)
 Karl Hoffmann, FDP
 Heinrich Höfler, CDU
 Heinrich Hohl, CDU (from 3 November 1949)
 Franz Höhne, SPD
 Friedrich Holzapfel, CDU (until 20 January 1953)
 Matthias Hoogen, CDU
 Hermann Höpker-Aschoff, FDP (until 9 September 1951)
 Anton Hoppe, CDU
 Michael Horlacher, CSU
 Peter Horn, CDU (from 10 June 1950)
 Elinor Hubert, SPD
 Karl Hübner, FDP (from 1 February 1952)
 Eugen Huth, CDU
 Margarete Hütter, FDP (from 15 September 1949)

I 

 Herta Ilk, FDP (from 3 November 1949)
 Heinrich Imig, SPD

J 

 Werner Jacobi, SPD
 Peter Jacobs, SPD
 Elfriede Jaeger, DKP-DRP (from 29 February 1952)
 Paul Hans Jaeger, FDP (from 22 January 1953)
 Richard Jaeger, CSU
 Robert Jaffé, DP (from 9 January 1952)
 Hans Jahn, SPD
 Albert Ludwig Juncker, FDP
 Johann Junglas, CDU

K 

 Karl Kahn, CSU
 Jakob Kaiser, CDU
 Oskar Kalbfell, SPD
 Hellmut Kalbitzer, SPD
 Margot Kalinke, DP
 Hugo Karpf, CSU
 Linus Kather, CDU
 Irma Keilhack, SPD
 Wilfried Keller, WAV (from 24 April 1952, from 6 December 1951 DP, Non-attached)
 Emil Kemmer, CSU
 Heinrich Kemper, CDU
 Karl Kern, CDU
 Dietrich Keuning, SPD
 Kurt Georg Kiesinger, CDU
 Georg Richard Kinat, SPD
 Liesel Kipp-Kaule, SPD
 Erich Klabunde, SPD (until 21 November 1950)
 Josef Ferdinand Kleindinst, CSU
 Friedrich Klinge, DP (until 21 December 1949)
 Otto Kneipp, FDP
 Waldemar von Knoeringen, SPD (until 3 April 1951)
 Wilhelm Knothe, SPD (until 20 February 1952)
 Harald Koch, SPD
 Georg Kohl, FDP (until 31 January 1952)
 Rudolf Kohl, KPD (from 26 January 1950)
 Erich Köhler, CDU (President of the Bundestag)
 Wilhelm Königswarter, SPD (from 1 February 1952)
 Hermann Kopf, CDU
 Lisa Korspeter, SPD
 Anni Krahnstöver, SPD
 Paul Krause, Zentrum (until 18 October 1950)
 Gerhard Kreyssig, SPD (from 4 April 1951)
 Herbert Kriedemann, SPD
 Heinrich Krone, CDU
 Christian Kuhlemann, DP
 Georg Kühling, CDU
 Walther Kühn, FDP
 Ernst Kuntscher, CDU
 Johannes Kunze, CDU
 Georg Kurlbaum, SPD

L 

 Wilhelm Laforet, CSU
 Roman Lampl, BP (from 10 November 1950, from 14 December 1951 FU)
 Erwin Lange, SPD
 Erich Langer, FDP (from 10 June 1952 Non-attached, from 29 March 1953 WAV)
 Willi Lausen, SPD
 Bruno Leddin, SPD (until 25 March 1951)
 Robert Lehr, CDU
 Robert Leibbrand, KPD (until 26 January 1950)
 Eugen Leibfried, CDU
 Ernst Lemmer, CDU (from 1 February 1952)
 Aloys Lenz, CDU
 Gottfried Leonhard, CDU
 Heinrich Leuchtgens, FDP (from 21 January 1950 DRP, from 5 October 1950 Non-attached (DRP), from 6 December 1950 DP, from 27 July 1953 partei- und Non-attached)
 Eduard Leuze, FDP (from 21 March 1952)
 Fritz Linnert, FDP (until 27 October 1949)
 Paul Löbe, SPD (Father of the House)
 Gertrud Lockmann, SPD (from 28 November 1950)
 Hans Löfflad, WAV (from 6 December 1951 DP)
 Bernhard Lohmüller, SPD (until 2 March 1952)
 Martin Loibl, CSU (until 16 April 1951)
 Alfred Loritz, WAV (from 6 December 1951 Non-attached, from 29 April 1953 WAV)
 Heinrich Lübke, CDU (until 30 September 1950)
 Paul Luchtenberg, FDP (from 30 October 1950)
 Paul Lücke, CDU
 Adolf Ludwig, SPD
 Gerhard Lütkens, SPD

M 

 Heinrich Maerkl, BP (from 1 September 1952)
 Ernst Majonica, CDU (from 19 November 1950)
 Robert Margulies, FDP
 Franz Marx, SPD
 Willy Massoth, CDU
 Heinz Matthes, DP
 Oskar Matzner, SPD
 Adolf Mauk, FDP (from 7 April 1952)
 Agnes Katharina Maxsein, CDU (from 1 February 1952)
 Ernst Mayer, FDP (until 18 December 1952)
 Friedrich Mayer, SPD
 Hugo Mayer, CDU
 Georg Mayerhofer, BP (from 14 December 1951 FU)
 Matthias Joseph Mehs, CDU
 Franz Xaver Meitinger, BP (from 26 September 1951, from 14 December 1951 FU)
 Karl Meitmann, SPD
 Wilhelm Mellies, SPD
 Erich Mende, FDP
 Fritz Mensing, CDU
 Walter Menzel, SPD
 Hans-Joachim von Merkatz, DP
 Hans Merten, SPD (from 23 April 1951)
 Arthur Mertins, SPD
 Erich Meyer, SPD
 Heinz Meyer, SPD
 Emmy Meyer-Laule, SPD
 Friedrich Middelhauve, FDP (until 17 October 1950)
 Herwart Miessner, DKP-DRP (from 5 October 1950 FDP-Gast, from 20 December 1950 FDP)
 Friedhelm Missmahl, SPD
 Karl Mommer, SPD
 Kurt Moosdorf, SPD (from 4 May 1952)
 Wendelin Morgenthaler, CDU
 Willibald Mücke, SPD
 Richard Muckermann, CDU
 Franz Mühlenberg, CDU
 Hans Mühlenfeld, DP (until 15 May 1953)
 Friederike Mulert, FDP (from 1 February 1952)
 Kurt Müller, KPD (from 10 May 1950 Non-attached)
 Heinrich Müller, SPD
 Karl Müller, CDU
 Oskar Müller, KPD
 Willy Müller, SPD
 Ernst Müller-Hermann, CDU (from 1 January 1952)

N 

 Friederike Nadig, SPD
 Wilhelm Naegel, CDU
 Jakob Neber, CDU
 Peter Nellen, CDU
 Kurt Neubauer, SPD (from 1 February 1952) (youngest member and last surviving member of the 1st Bundestag)
 August Neuburger, CDU
 Franz Neumann, SPD
 Fritz Neumayer, FDP
 Christof Nickl, CSU
 Otto Niebergall, KPD
 Heinrich Niebes, KPD (from 10 July 1952)
 Maria Niggemeyer, CDU
 Wilhelm Niklas, CSU (from 30 May 1951)
 Robert Philipp Nöll von der Nahmer, FDP
 Erik Nölting, SPD (until 15 July 1953)
 Wilhelm Nowack, FDP (until 30 September 1952)
 Friedrich Nowack, SPD
 Hermann Nuding, KPD (until 20 April 1951)

O 

 Willy Odenthal, SPD (from 28 September 1951)
 Fritz Oellers, FDP (until 5 June 1951)
 Josef Oesterle, CSU
 Eugen Fürst zu Oettingen-Wallerstein, BP (from 8 January 1951, from 14 December 1951 FU, until 1 September 1952)
 Richard Oetzel, CDU (from 24 January 1953)
 Fritz Ohlig, SPD
 Erich Ollenhauer, SPD
 Alfred Onnen, FDP
 Eduard Orth, CDU
 Franz Ott, unabhängig (Non-attached, from 4 May 1950 WAV-Gast, from 13 October 1950 BHE/DG, from 21 March 1952 Non-attached, from 26 March 1952 DP/DPB-Gast, from 26 June 1952 Non-attached)

P 

 Otto Pannenbecker, Zentrum (from 14 December 1951 FU)
 Sepp Parzinger, BP (from 14 December 1951 FU)
 Wilhelm Paschek, WAV (from 29 March 1950 DRP-Gast, from 5 October 1950 Non-attached, from 30 January 1951 WAV, from 6 December 1951 DP, until 22 April 1952)
 Ernst Paul, SPD
 Hugo Paul, KPD
 Georg Pelster, CDU
 Georg Peters, SPD
 Franz Pfender, CDU
 Robert Pferdmenges, CDU (from 12 January 1950)
 Karl Georg Pfleiderer, FDP
 Kurt Pohle, SPD
 Bernard Povel, CDU (until 21 October 1952)
 Ludwig Preiß, FDP
 Ludwig Preller, SPD (from 16 March 1951)
 Victor-Emanuel Preusker, FDP
 Moritz-Ernst Priebe, SPD
 Maria Probst, CSU
 Hermann Pünder, CDU

R 

 Willy Max Rademacher, FDP
 Bernhard Raestrup, CDU
 Wilhelm Rahn, BP (from 14 January 1950, from 8 September 1950 Non-attached, from 17 October 1950 WAV-Gast, from 14 February 1951 CSU)
 Wilhelm Rath, FDP
 Hans Albrecht Freiherr von Rechenberg, FDP (until 19 January 1953)
 Luise Rehling, CDU
 Hans Reif, FDP
 Max Reimann, KPD
 Otto Reindl, WAV (from 6 December 1951 DP/DPB, from 9 December 1952 Non-attached, from 29 April 1953 WAV)
 Bernhard Reismann, Zentrum (from 14 December 1951 FU)
 Richard Reitzner, SPD
 Heinz Renner, KPD
 Hans Revenstorff, FDP
 Gerhard Ribbeheger, Zentrum (from 14 December 1951 FU)
 Willi Richter, SPD
 Friedrich Rische, KPD
 Heinrich Georg Ritzel, SPD
 Julie Rösch, CDU
 Franz Richter – Fritz Rößler alias „Dr Franz Richter“, DKP-DRP (from 15 September 1949 Nationale Rechte, from 6 September 1950 Non-attached, from 13 December 1950 WAV-Gast, from 17 January 1951 WAV, from 26 September 1951 Non-attached, until 21 February 1952)
 Ernst Roth, SPD (until 14 May 1951)
 Karl Rüdiger, FDP (until 20 February 1951)
 Heinrich-Wilhelm Ruhnke, SPD
 Oskar Rümmele, CDU
 Hermann Runge, SPD

S 

 Anton Sabel, CDU
 Gustav Sander, SPD
 Walter Sassnick, SPD
 Hermann Schäfer, FDP
 Fritz Schäffer, CSU
 Marta Schanzenbach, SPD
 Hugo Scharnberg, CDU
 Josef Schatz, CSU
 Ernst Schellenberg, SPD (from 1 February 1952)
 Lambert Schill, CDU
 Hans Schlange-Schöningen, CDU (until 9 June 1950)
 Carlo Schmid, SPD
 Wilhelm Schmidt, WAV (from 6 December 1951 DP/DPB, from 9 December 1952 Non-attached)
 Martin Schmidt, SPD
 Joseph Schmitt, CDU
 Hans Schmitz, CDU
 Kurt Schmücker, CDU
 Ludwig Schneider, FDP
 Erwin Schoettle, SPD
 Friedrich Schönauer, SPD (until 2 April 1950)
 Joachim Schöne, SPD
 Gerhard Schröder, CDU
 Louise Schroeder, SPD
 Carl Schröter, CDU (until 25 February 1952)
 Richard Schröter, SPD (from 1 February 1952)
 Fritz Schuler, CDU
 Hubert Schulze-Pellengahr, CDU
 Kurt Schumacher, SPD (Leader of the Opposition, died 20 August 1952)
 Johann Schuster, WAV (from 6 December 1951 DP)
 Josef Schüttler, CDU
 Hans Schütz, CSU
 Hans-Christoph Seebohm, DP
 Gebhard Seelos, BP (until 25 September 1951)
 Johann Segitz, SPD (from 4 December 1951)
 Johannes Semler, CSU (from 14 May 1950)
 Günther Serres, CDU
 Walter Seuffert, SPD
 Günther Sewald, CDU (until 25 November 1949)
 Theodor Siebel, CDU
 Max Solleder, CSU
 Josef Spies, CSU
 Karl Graf von Spreti, CSU
 Willy Stahl, FDP
 Robert Stauch, CDU
 Paul Stech, SPD
 Artur Stegner, FDP
 Viktoria Steinbiß, CDU
 Willi Steinhörster, SPD
 Georg Stierle, SPD
 Hermann Stopperich, SPD (until 6 January 1952)
 Anton Storch, CDU
 Franz Josef Strauss, CSU
 Otto Striebeck, SPD
 Käte Strobel, SPD
 Gertrud Strohbach, KPD (from 16 May 1951)
 Detlef Struve, CDU
 Richard Stücklen, CSU
 Otto Suhr, SPD (until 31 January 1952)

T 

 Johann Temmen, SPD
 Wilhelm Tenhagen, SPD
 Adolf von Thadden, DKP-DRP (from 15 September 1949 Nationale Rechte; 1950 DRP, from 20 April 1950 Non-attached)
 Grete Thiele, KPD
 Hans Tichi, WAV (from 13 October 1950 BHE/DG, from 21 March 1952 Non-attached)
 Robert Tillmanns, CDU
 Peter Tobaben, DP
 Josef Trischler, FDP
 Hermann Troppenz, SPD

V 

 Hermann Veit, SPD
 Walter Vesper, KPD (until 30 June 1952)
 Rudolf Vogel, CDU
 Ludwig Volkholz, BP (from 14 December 1951 FU)
 Axel de Vries, FDP (from 5 January 1953)

W 

 Oskar Wacker, CDU
 Oskar Wackerzapp, CDU
 Friedrich Wilhelm Wagner, SPD
 Eduard Wahl, CDU
 Josef Wallner, WAV (from 6 December 1951 DP/DPB, from 9 December 1952 Non-attached)
 Albert Walter, DP
 Johann Wartner, BP (from 14 December 1951 FU)
 Helene Weber, CDU
 Karl Weber, CDU
 Herbert Wehner, SPD
 Philipp Wehr, SPD (from 21 May 1952)
 Stephan Weickert, WAV (from 13 October 1950 BHE/DG, until 16 March 1952)
 August Weinhold, SPD
 Franz Weiß, CDU
 Erwin Welke, SPD
 Hans Wellhausen, FDP
 Ernst Weltner, SPD
 Fritz Wenzel, SPD
 Helene Wessel, Zentrum (from 14 December 1951 FU, from 13 November 1952 Non-attached (GVP))
 Eberhard Wildermuth, FDP (until 9 March 1952)
 Rudolf Will, FDP (from 1 February 1952)
 Alex Willenberg, Zentrum (from 26 October 1950, from 14 December 1951 FU)
 Bernhard Winkelheide, CDU
 Ernst Winter, SPD (from 9 November 1952)
 Carl Wirths, FDP
 Otto Wittenburg, DP
 Konrad Wittmann, WAV (from 6 December 1951 DP, from 9 May 1952 Non-attached, from 5 July 1952 CDU/CSU-Gast)
 Jeanette Wolff, SPD (from 1 February 1952)
 Ernst Woltje, DP (from 30 May 1953)
 Max Wönner, SPD
 Franz-Josef Wuermeling, CDU

Z 

 Walter Zawadil, FDP (from 26 November 1952 DP)
 , BP (until 30 December 1949)
 Georg-August Zinn, SPD (until 21 January 1951)
 Ernst Zühlke, SPD

See also 

 Politics of Germany
 List of Bundestag Members

01